is a monthly shōnen manga magazine in Japan published by Kadokawa Shoten, started in 1994. Unlike the big shōnen weeklies with circulation figures in the millions, Ace is aimed at a less mainstream audience, and has a particular emphasis on anime tie-ins.

Manga artists and series featured in Shōnen Ace

 Katsu Aki
 The Vision of Escaflowne (shōnen version; shōjo version was serialized in Asuka Fantasy DX)
 Keiichi Arawi
 Nichijou
 Clamp
 Angelic Layer
 Nishiwaki Datto
 Fate/stay night
 Sakae Esuno
 Hanako and the Terror of Allegory
 Future Diary
 Big Order 
 Kamui Fujiwara
 Kerberos Panzer Cop (story by Mamoru Oshii, previously ran in Combat Comic and Amazing Comics)
 Masaru Gotsubo
 Samurai Champloo
 Ryūsuke Hamamoto
 Petit Eva (original work by Gainax & khara inc.)
 Yuichi Hasegawa
Mobile Suit Crossbone Gundam (story by Yoshiyuki Tomino)
 Mobile Suit Victory Gundam Outside Story
 Sekihiko Inui
 Ratman 
 Yūji Iwahara
 Chikyu Misaki
 Koudelka
 Sōsuke Kaise
 Grenadier
 Kaishaku
 Kannazuki no Miko
 Steel Angel Kurumi (originally featured in Monthly Shonen Ace Dash/A' DASH, later moved to Monthly Ace Next; now discontinued)
 Mario Kaneda
 Girls Bravo
 Saving Life
 Karuna Kanzaki
 Armed Girl's Machiavellism (written by Yūya Kurokami) 
 Jinsei Kataoka and Kazuma Kondou
 Eureka Seven
 Deadman Wonderland
 Smokin' Parade 
 Ranmaru Kotone
The Girl Who Leapt Through Time
 Masami Kurumada
 B't X
 Tomohiro Marukawa
 The World of Narue
 Sankichi Meguro
 Ghost Talker's Daydream (written by Saki Okuse)
 Haruhiko Mikimoto
 Macross 7: Trash
 Macross The First
 Suu Minazuki
 Judas
 Heaven's Lost Property
 Plunderer 
 Seijuro Miz
 Mushi-Uta
 Masato Natsumoto
 Record of Lodoss War: Chronicles of the Heroic Knight (story by Ryo Mizuno)
 Kenji Oiwa
 Welcome to the N.H.K. (created by Tatsuhiko Takimoto)
 Yoshiyuki Sadamoto
 Neon Genesis Evangelion (moved to Young Ace in 2009)
 Kei Sanbe
 Kamiyadori
 Hajime Segawa
 Ga-Rei
 Tokyo ESP 
 Monako Serasai
 Kaitō Tenshi Twin Angel
 Tatsuya Shingyoji
 The King of Fighters '94
 Kumiko Suekane
 Blood+
 Yukiru Sugisaki
 Brain Powerd (story by Yoshiyuki Tomino)
 Shou Tajima
 Multiple Personality Detective Psycho (story by Eiji Otsuka; moved to Young Ace in 2009)
 Yoshiki Takaya
 Bio Booster Armor Guyver (moved to Young Ace in 2009, continued here after Monthly Shōnen Captains cancelation)
 Kitsune Tennouji
 Eden's Bowy (pulled from Comptiq in 1994)
 Yasunari Toda
 Mobile Suit Gundam Seed Astray R (story by Tomohiro Chiba, created by Yoshiyuki Tomino and Hajime Yatate)
 Tetsuto Uesu
 Shinmai Maō no Testament
 Housui Yamazaki
 Mail
 Kagami Yoshimizu
 Lucky Star (cameo strips only)
 Mine Yoshizaki
 Sgt. Frog (ongoing)
 Kumichi Yoshizuki
 Someday's Dreamers: Summer Skies (story by Norie Yamada)
 Natsume Akatsuki
 Kemono Michi (ongoing)
 Imaru Adachi
 Higehiro: After Being Rejected, I Shaved and Took In a High School Runaway (ongoing)
 Ikumi Hino
 Mother of the Goddess' Dormitory
 Masahiro Ikeno
 Banished from the Heroes' Party (ongoing)
 Yū Shimizu
 The Demon Sword Master of Excalibur Academy (ongoing)
 Sae Amatsu
 Guardian Hearts
 Meguru Ueno
 My First Girlfriend Is a Gal (ongoing)

Circulation

References

External links
Shōnen Ace on Web Kadokawa 

1994 establishments in Japan
Kadokawa Shoten magazines
Magazines established in 1994
Magazines published in Tokyo
Monthly manga magazines published in Japan
Shōnen manga magazines